The 11th Parliament of Singapore was the previous Parliament of Singapore. The first session commenced on 2 November 2006 and was prorogued on 13 April 2009. The second session commence from 18 May 2009 and was dissolved on 19 April 2011. The membership was set by the 2006 Singapore General Election on 7 May 2006, and it has changed twice due to the deaths of Jurong GRC MP Dr Ong Chit Chung in 2008, and Ang Mo Kio GRC MP Balaji Sadasivan who was also the Senior Minister of State for Foreign Affairs.

The 11th Parliament is controlled by a People's Action Party majority, led by Prime Minister Lee Hsien Loong and members of the cabinet, which assumed power on 7 May 2006. The Opposition is led by the Secretary General of the Worker's Party of Singapore, Mr Low Thia Kiang. The Speaker of the Parliament of Singapore is Abdullah bin Tarmugi, of the People's Action Party.  He was re-elected as the Speaker of the House for the 11th Parliament on 2 November 2006.

Officeholders

Speakers 
Speaker: Abdullah Tarmugi (PAP)
Deputy Speaker:
Indranee Rajah (PAP), from 8 November 2006
Matthias Yao (PAP), from 8 November 2006

Leaders
Prime Minister: Lee Hsien Loong (PAP)
Leader of the Opposition: Low Thia Khiang (WP)

House Leaders
Leader of the House:
Wong Kan Seng (PAP), until 31 March 2007
Mah Bow Tan (PAP), from 1 April 2007
Deputy Leader of the House: 
Mah Bow Tan (PAP), until 31 March 2007
Ng Eng Hen (PAP), from 1 April 2007

Whips
Party Whip of the People's Action Party:
Lee Boon Yang, until 31 March 2007
Lim Swee Say, from 1 April 2007
Deputy Party Whip of the People's Action Party:
Inderjit Singh
Lim Swee Say, until 30 May 2007
Amy Khor, from 1 April 2007

Composition

Members

Elected Members of Parliament

Non-constituency Members of Parliament 
The Worker's Party, being the best performing opposition party with 16.34 percent of the popular vote, was awarded a Non-constituency Member of Parliament seat in accordance with the Constitution. The NCMP seat was eventually taken up by Sylvia Lim, the chairperson of the Worker's Party.

Nominated Members of Parliament 

 Gautam Banerjee, from 18 January 2007 until 17 July 2009
 Cham Hui Fong, from 18 January 2007 until 17 July 2009
 Edwin Khew Teck Fook, from 18 January 2007 until 17 July 2009
 Loo Choon Yong, from 18 January 2007 until 17 July 2009
 Kalyani K. Mehta, from 18 January 2007 until 17 July 2009
 Eunice Elizabeth Olsen, from 18 January 2007 until 17 July 2009
 Jessie Phua, from 18 January 2007 until 17 July 2009
 Siew Kum Hong, from 18 January 2007 until 17 July 2009
 Thio Li-ann, from 18 January 2007 until 17 July 2009
 Calvin Cheng, from 18 July 2009
 Terry Lee Kok Hua, from 18 July 2009
 Viswa Sadasivan, from 18 July 2009
 Mildred Tan-Sim Beng Mei, from 18 July 2009
 Paulin Tay Straughan, from 18 July 2009
 Teo Siong Seng, from 18 July 2009
 Laurence Wee Yoke Thong, from 18 July 2009
 Audrey Wong Wai Yen, from 18 July 2009
 Joscelin Yeo, from 18 July 2009

Vacancies

References 

Parliament of Singapore